For a surface in three dimension the focal surface, surface of centers or evolute is formed by taking the centers of the curvature spheres, which are the tangential spheres whose radii are the reciprocals of one of the principal curvatures at the point of tangency. Equivalently it is the surface formed by the centers of the circles which osculate the curvature lines.

As the principal curvatures are the eigenvalues of the second fundamental form, there are two at each point, and these give rise to two points of the focal surface on each normal direction to the surface. Away from umbilical points, these two points of the focal surface are distinct; at umbilical points the two sheets come together. When the surface has a ridge the focal surface has a cuspidal edge, three such edges pass through an elliptical umbilic and only one through a hyperbolic umbilic. At points where the Gaussian curvature is zero, one sheet of the focal surface will have a point at infinity corresponding to the zero principal curvature.

  and 
are the corresponding two points of the focal surface.

Special cases

The focal surface of a sphere consists of a single point, its center. 
One part of the focal surface of a surface of revolution consists of the axis of rotation.
The focal surface of a Torus consists of the directrix circle and the axis of rotation.
The focal surface of a Dupin cyclide consists of a pair of focal conics. The Dupin cyclides are the only surfaces, whose focal surfaces degenerate into two curves.
One part of the focal surface of a channel surface degenerates to its directrix.
Two confocal quadrics (for example an ellipsoid and a hyperboloid of one sheet) can be considered as focal surfaces of a surface.

See also
Focus (optics)
Evolute

Notes

References

 .

Surfaces